Captain Raleigh Croshaw or Crashaw (c. 1584 – 1624) was an English merchant and early immigrant to the Colony and Dominion of Virginia who represented Elizabeth City County in the House of Burgesses in 1624.

Virginia settler
Although Croshaw is believed to be from the Crashaw family of Crawshawbooth, Lancashire, England; his parentage and date of birth are not known. Rev. William Crashaw was a member of the Virginia Company, as was his son the poet. In any event, Raleigh Crashaw arrived in Jamestown, Virginia on the Mary & Margrett, with the Second Supply in September 1608. He eventually received a head right for his wife, so she emigrated by 1620. However, she is not listed on the passenger rolls of the Bona Nova during any of its travels from London to Virginia. Since no reference to Captain Rawley Crashaw's wife exists in land deeds nor the 1623 Census, she presumably died before 1623. First listed as a member of the Virginia Company of London in 1609, Capt. Crashaw was still listed as an adventurer in the Company in both 1618 and 1620. He was one of the authors of the complimentary verses prefixed to The General History of Virginia, New England, and the Summer Isles (1624) of John Smith of Jamestown.

Family
Croshaw and his wife had at least two sons, possibly three:,
With his first wife he had Katherine Crowshaw (Graves), wife of Thomas Graves.

Joseph Croshaw (1610–1667), married 1. Unknown; 2. Widow Finch ; 3. Widow Anne Hodges;  4. Widow Margaret Tucker;  5. Widow Mary Bromfield
(possibly) Noah Croshaw (1614–1665), married Elinor 
Richard Croshaw (1618–1667), married Elizabeth _

Indian trader and fighter
Raleigh Croshaw was mentioned as being a member of the group with Captain John Smith in January 1609 who, while attempting to trade for corn with the Indigenous Powhatan People at Chief Opechancanough's village, were almost overcome by a surprise attack, only to be thwarted in part by Croshaw's quick reactions.

At the time of the massacre in March 1622, Croshaw was trading on the Potomac River. According to Captain John Smith's General History, Croshaw challenged Chief Opchanacanough or any of his warriors to fight him naked (without armor), an offer that was not accepted. When Captain John Smith published his General History in 1624, one of the verses in Volume III of the book was written by Croshaw.

In The History of the First Discovery and Settlement of Virginia (1747), William Stith wrote, "Captain Raleigh Croshaw was in the Potomac River trading in a small bark, commanded by Captain Spilman. There an Indian stole aboard and told them of the massacre, (1622) and that Opchanacanough had been practicing with his King and Country to betray them, which they refused to do, but that the Indians of Werowocomoco had undertaken it. Captain Spilman went there, but the Indians after seeing that his men were so vigilant and well armed, suspected that they had been discovered, therefore, to delude him, they gave him such good deals in trade, that his vessel was soon nearly overloaded."

Ancient planter

About 1623 a land patent was issued to "Captain Raleigh Croshaw, Gentleman, of Kiccoughtan, "An Ancient Planter who hath remained in this country 15 years complete and performed many a worthy service to the Colony," for 500 acres (2 km²) near Old Point Comfort. This was based on his transporting himself, his servant and his wife in addition to adventuring 25 pounds sterling in the Company. Kiccoughtan or Kiquotan was the first settlement in Elizabeth City County, the name of a Native American village on the site of Hampton.

The next year citizens of Elizabeth City County elected Crashaw as one of the burgesses representing them in the House of Burgesses. In March 1624 Crashaw received a commission to trade with the Indians for corn. On this voyage he purchased a "great canoe" for 10,000 blue beads. The Corporation of Elizabeth City states that "Captain Raleigh Croshaw planted by Patent 500 acres (2 km²) between Fox Hill and the Pamunkey River to establish Elizabeth City." Captain Raleigh Croshaw was last referred to on November 22, 1624.

Death
On December 27, 1624, Captain Francis West was instructed to take an inventory of his estate. Richard and Joseph Croshaw of York County (adjacent to Elizabeth City County) are listed in several records dating from the colony's first five or six decades. 

By 1637 the York County settlers had already begun to breach their own palisade and move into Indian land on the other side. The area between Queens Creek and Ware Creek was called the "Indian Fields," referring to its use by Native Americans for planting corn communally. Again, it was Joseph Croshaw and Richard Croshaw who were the first to move into the area.  In 1637 and 1638, they each patented a few thousand acres about where the Camp Peary government center is located today. They controlled most of the land in that area for the next 20–25 years.

References

Additional sources
Crowshaw, by Martha Woodroof Hiden; William and Mary Qtrly (2), XXI, pp265 70.
General Historie, by John Smith, 1624, Vol III, pp 78 81, Vol IV, pp. 151 154.
The Complete Works of Captain John Smith, edited by Philip L. Barbour; Vol II, University of North Carolina Press, Chapel Hill, NC, 1986.
Hotten's Lists, Virginia Musters.
Letter, dated May [16], 1621, from Jabez Whittaker, in Virginia, sent to Sir Edwin Sandys, London, on the departing Bona Nova. (S.M. Kingsbury, "Records of the Virginia Company", 1933, v.III, page 297)

1580s births
1624 deaths

House of Burgesses members
English emigrants
People from Elizabeth City County, Virginia
People from Crawshawbooth
Virginia colonial people